Judge Turner may refer to:

Bolon B. Turner (1897–1987), judge of the United States Tax Court
Ezekiel B. Turner (1825–1888), judge of the United States District Court for the Western District of Texas
James T. Turner (born 1938), judge of the United States Claims Court
Jerome Turner (1942–2000), judge of the United States District Court for the Western District of Tennessee

See also
Justice Turner (disambiguation)